Bosch-Halle is an indoor sporting arena located in Wels, Austria.  The capacity of the arena is 9.060 people.

Indoor ice hockey venues in Austria
Sports venues in Upper Austria